Marginella hernandezi is a species of sea snail, a marine gastropod mollusc in the family Marginellidae, the marginellids.

Description
The length of the shell attains 9.4 mm.

The shell of the species has grey to black thin lines and its outer part ranges from white to grey.

Distribution
This species occurs off and is endemic to São Tomé and Príncipe Islands, Gulf of Guinea, West Africa.

References

hernandezi
Endemic fauna of São Tomé and Príncipe
Invertebrates of São Tomé and Príncipe
Molluscs of the Atlantic Ocean
Gastropods described in 2014